Wendy Elizabeth McCarthy  (born 22 July 1941 in , New South Wales) is an Australian businesswoman, activist and former university administrator. McCarthy has worked for reform across the public, private and community sectors, in education, family planning, human rights, public health, and overseas aid and development, as well as in conservation, heritage, and media.

Biography 
Aged sixteen, McCarthy was awarded a teacher scholarship to attend the University of New England and began her professional life as a secondary school teacher, teaching in Sydney, London and Pittsburgh.

Her first experience as a political lobbyist came about in 1968 when, newly pregnant, she and her husband joined the Childbirth Education Association, campaigning for, among other issues, the rights of fathers to be present at the births of their children. In 1972 she established the NSW branch of the Women’s Electoral Lobby, before taking on the role of Education, Information and Media Officer with Family Planning Association of NSW in 1975, and eventually that of CEO of the Australian Federation of Family Planning Associations. Her leadership in these issues was quickly recognised with her appointment to the National Women's Advisory Council in 1978, a new office that was to advise the then Prime Minister Malcolm Fraser on policy issues affecting women. McCarthy has represented Australia at conferences on women’s health and leadership, education, broadcasting, conservation and heritage and for four years was Chair of the Advisory Committee of WHO Kobe Centre, Japan.

McCarthy’s career as an advocate for women was advanced during a period of significant reform and change when she served as the Deputy Chair of the Australian Broadcasting Corporation (1983-1991), while also working as General Manager Communications with the Australian Bicentennial Authority (1985-1989).

In the education sector, McCarthy was the first woman appointed to the NSW Higher Education Board and also served on the NSW Education Commission. She was a founding member of Chief Executive Women, an organisation established to mentor and support female executives, and served as its president during 1995-96. In 1995 she was appointed to the Economic Planning Advisory Commission’s four member Task Force report to Prime Minister on Australia's child care needs to 2010. In 2005 she completed a decade as Chancellor of the University of Canberra.

McCarthy's leadership in the public and women’s health sectors continued with her role as chair of the National Better Health for All and associated National Better Health Program Management Committee (1989 – 1992). A decade later she was a member NSW Health Care Advisory Council, chair NSW Health Participation Council, and co-chair of the NSW Sustainable Access Health Priority Taskforce. She was also a member of the Royal College of Physicians Research and Education Foundation (1991-1994), President of the Royal Hospital for Women Foundation (1995-1998) and as a patron of the Australian Reproductive Health Alliance (2007-2011). McCarthy has served as the chair of the Pacific Friends of the Global Fund to fight AIDS, Tuberculosis and Malaria (2007-2015). International appointments have included four years as Chair of the Advisory Committee at the World Health Organisation Kobe Centre (1999-2002), and twelve years as Chair of Plan Australia (1998-2009), with three years as Global Deputy Chair with Plan International (2007-2009). Other significant appointments include services as the CEO of the National Trust of Australia NSW (1990-1993); Chair of the Australian Heritage Commission (1995 – 1998); a Member of the Sydney Symphony Orchestra Council and subsequently Chair of Symphony Australia; a Director of the Australian Multicultural Foundation; and a Director of Star City. In June 2016 she stepped down after eight years as Chair of headspace – the National Youth Mental Health Foundation; and in 2017 stepped down as Chair of Circus Oz, after nine years in the role.

Honours and awards 
In 1989, McCarthy was appointed an Officer of the Order of Australia for outstanding contributions to community affairs, women’s affairs and the Bicentennial celebrations. In 1996 she was awarded an Honorary Doctorate from the University of South Australia and in 2003 she was awarded a Centenary of Federation medal for business leadership. In 2005 she was nominated by The Sydney Morning Herald as one of Australia’s Top 100 Public Intellectuals and in 2011 she was featured in the International Women’s Day publication The Power of One which profiled 100 women who have shaped Australia. In 2013 she was inducted into the Women’s Agenda Hall of Fame for her contribution to the lives of Australian women.

Current roles 
McCarthy currently is Deputy-Chair of Goodstart Early Learning. She is also a Non-executive Director of IMF Bentham, the world’s most experienced and successful litigation funder. She is a Patron of the Sydney Women’s Fund, Ambassador for 1 Million Women, and Advisor to Grace Papers.

McCarthy is an experienced speaker and facilitator, and regularly comments on social and political issues. She enjoys writing and is the author of a number of books, including her memoirs Don’t Fence Me In published by Random House in 2000 and Don't Be Too Polite, Girls published by Allen & Unwin in 2022.

References

External links

1941 births
Living people
Chancellors of the University of Canberra
Australian women in business
Officers of the Order of Australia
Recipients of the Centenary Medal
University of New England (Australia) alumni